was the thirty-fourth of the fifty-three stations of the Tōkaidō. It is located in the center of what is now the city of Toyohashi, Aichi Prefecture, Japan.

History
Yoshida-juku was established in 1601 as a post station within the castle town surrounding Yoshida Castle, an important feudal domain and port town in Mikawa Province. Yoshida had a bridge which crossed the Toyokawa River. This was one of the few bridges permitted on the Tōkaidō by the Tokugawa shogunate. One the larger post stations on the Tōkaidō, it stretched for 2.6 kilometers along the highway, and in a census taken in 1802, there were two honjin, one  waki-honjin and 65 hatago to serve the travelers. The town as a whole consisted of approximately 1,000 buildings and had a population of 5,000 to 7,000 people. As with neighboring Goyu-shuku and Fukagawa-juku, it had a reputation for its meshimori onna.

The classic ukiyo-e print by Andō Hiroshige (Hōeidō edition) from 1831–1834 depicts the famous bridge at Yoshida, as well as Yoshida Castle.

Further reading
Carey, Patrick. Rediscovering the Old Tokaido:In the Footsteps of Hiroshige. Global Books UK (2000). 
Chiba, Reiko. Hiroshige's Tokaido in Prints and Poetry. Tuttle. (1982) 
Taganau, Jilly. The Tokaido Road: Travelling and Representation in Edo and Meiji Japan. RoutledgeCurzon (2004).

Neighboring post towns
Tōkaidō
Futagawa-juku - Yoshida-juku - Goyu-shuku

References

Stations of the Tōkaidō
Stations of the Tōkaidō in Aichi Prefecture